Orla Brixler (23 August 1918 – 3 April 1957) was a Danish footballer. He played in four matches for the Denmark national football team from 1938 to 1943.

References

External links
 

1918 births
1957 deaths
Danish men's footballers
Denmark international footballers
Place of birth missing
Association football midfielders
AaB Fodbold players